Jarnot is a surname. Notable people with the surname include:

 Konrad Jarnot (born 1972), English baritone
 Lisa Jarnot (born 1967), American poet and translator